Lyndon Trott (born 17 July 1964, St. Sampson, Guernsey) is an elected Deputy in the States of Guernsey and served as the Chief Minister of Guernsey from 2008 to 2012.

Political appointments
Deputy Trott has been a deputy in the States of Guernsey since 2000.  Re-elected in 2004 and again in 2008.

From 2004 until 2008 he was the Treasury and Resources Minister before being elected to the position of Chief Minister of Guernsey on 1 May 2008. His term of office expired on 30 April 2012. He succeeded Mike Torode as Guernsey's third Chief Minister following the creation of the post in 2004.

He was re-elected as a Deputy for the electoral district of St. Sampson in the General Election of 2012 and again in 2016, being elected as Vice President of the Policy and Resources Committee, the Senior Committee of the States of Guernsey following the 2016 changes.

In August 2020, Trott formed the Guernsey Partnership of Independents party with Heidi Soulsby and Gavin St Pier.

References

1973 births
Government ministers of Guernsey
Living people
Members of the States of Guernsey
Guernsey people